William Caldwell Hill (14 April 1866 – 15 November 1939) was an Australian politician. He was a member of the Country Party and served in the House of Representatives from 1919 to 1934. He was Minister for Works and Railways in the Bruce–Page Government from 1924 to 1928.

Early life
Hill was born on 14 April 1866 at Burnt Creek near Dunolly, Victoria. He was the son of English immigrants Sarah (née Baker) and John Hill; his mother was illiterate. His father and uncle ran the local flour mill, but after the mill burned down the family moved to Stradbroke to take up a selection of uncleared forest.

Hill was educated at a part-time school in Stradbroke before joining the clerical division of Victorian Railways. He served as stationmaster at Elphinstone, during which time he would walk several miles to Castlemaine to attend evening classes. He married Lucy Shields in 1892; her father Edward Shields was mayor of Chewton. Following the death of his father-in-law, Hill left the railways to manage the family's tannery in Chewton. He served on the Chewton Borough Council from 1900 to 1906 and was secretary of the Castlemaine Rifle Clubs' Union.

Farming
In 1906, Hill took up a portion of David Mitchell's subdivided estate at Colbinabbin. He served as the secretary of the Colbinabbin Progress Association and in 1915 was elected secretary of the Wheat Pool Vigilance Committee, formed by farmers concerned that the government and wheat merchants were conspiring to reduce the price of wheat. In 1916, Hill was elected as the founding president of the Victorian Farmers' Union (VFU). He was also a delegate to the Australian Farmers' Federal Organization, a member of the Victorian Wheat Commission's advisory council, a growers' representative on the Australian Wheat Board, and chairman of the Farmers' Advocate newspaper published in Melbourne. He led a movement to supply cheaper superphosphate to farmers and served as chairman of the Phosphate Co-operative Company of Australia.

Politics

On 20 September 1919, at the by-election caused by the death of Albert Palmer, he won the House of Representatives Division of Echuca as a Victorian Farmers' Union candidate.  In 1920 he helped form the Country Party. From 8 August 1924 to 29 November 1928 he was Minister for Works and Railways in the Bruce–Page government.  During his period of office he commenced the standardisation of the railway gauges by the construction of the North Coast railway line from Kyogle, to South Brisbane, the construction of the rail line from Oodnadatta, South Australia, to Alice Springs by Commonwealth Railways, the introduction of a Federal aid road scheme—which provided funding to the states for road construction—and the building of the Hume Dam, which he promoted as president of the inter-governmental River Murray Water Commission.  He retired from Parliament on 7 August 1934, because he was unwilling to sign a pledge to vote in parliament as instructed by his party, and he was succeeded as the member for Echuca by John McEwen, future leader of the Federal Country Party.

Later life
Hill died at Nar Nar Goon, survived by his wife Bella and by six children.

Notes

National Party of Australia members of the Parliament of Australia
Members of the Australian House of Representatives for Echuca
Members of the Australian House of Representatives
1866 births
1939 deaths
20th-century Australian politicians